Liriel Domiciano (born November 26, 1981) is a Brazilian pop star and classical singer.  She is a soprano.  She was born in São Paulo. Along with Rinaldo Viana, she won the" "Quem Sabe Canta, Quem Não Sabe Dança" from Programa Raul Gil, the equivalent of the United States' American Idol. Their first CD, Romance, became the second-highest classical bestseller in Brazilian history. Two CDs released later also became bestsellers.

Life 
Liriel was discovered at a bridal fair in São Paulo. She had never taken formal singing lessons, but was singing classical arias at the age of 5. Around the age of 14, she began singing with a group called "Voices of Zion." She was applying for a job as a seamstress at the bridal fair, but auditioned instead to be a wedding singer, choosing a Puccini aria for her material. Within a short time, she was on television.

Religion 
Domiciano joined the Church of Jesus Christ of Latter-day Saints (LDS Church) at the age of 14. It has proven to be an important part of her life and character. During the 8 months of the Raul Gil Amateur Show, she wore a medallion that represented her faith and values. She also decided not to sign with Brazil's biggest talent agency because she has made a commitment to sing for the Church.

On April 4, 2004, Liriel became the first soloist to sing at the LDS Church's General Conference since the 1930s.

Discography

Romance 

 En Aranjuez Con Tu Amor
 Con Te Partiró
 Tristesse
 Tormento D´Amore
 Solo Con Te
 Can You Feel The Love Tonight
 Caruso
 Adágio De Albinoni
 Canto Della Terra
 Eu Nunca Mais Vou Te Esquecer
 Panis Angelicus
 Adeste Fideles
 Noite Feliz

Tempo de Amar 

 Strani Amori
 Hábito Do Amor
 Nessun Dorma
 Piano
 Me Espere Até Amanhã
 Planeta Água
 Alta Luce Del Sole
 Tempo De Amar
 Here In My Heart
 Canção Inesperada
 Entre O Céu E O Mar
 Se Eu Não Te Encontrasse
 O Sonhador
 La Bohème

Heaven's Eyes 

 March With Me
 The Star In You
 Monte Castelo
 II Cuor Senza Sangue
 Half A Chance
 Heaven's Eyes
 Dream A Dream
 Someday, Somewhere
 Cantico
 Songs Of Lullaby
 The Moment
 Lift Up Your Heads
 Everyday I Love You
 The World In Union

References

General references

External links 
Rinaldo Viana and Liriel Domiciano singing Can You Feel the Love Tonight? — YouTube
Liriel singing with the Mormon Tabernacle Choir — YouTube
Voices of Zion

1981 births
Brazilian sopranos
Brazilian Latter Day Saints
Converts to Mormonism
Living people
21st-century Brazilian singers
21st-century Brazilian women singers